The A-Rosa Luna is a German river cruise ship, cruising in the Rhone – Saône basin. The ship was built by Neptun Werft GmbH at their shipyard in Warnemünde, Germany, and entered service in 2005. Her sister ship is A-Rosa Stella. Her home port is currently Rostock.

Features
The ship has restaurant, two lounges and bar, big-chess, Finnish sauna, steam sauna and resting area.

See also
 List of river cruise ships

References

External links

2004 ships
River cruise ships